Cranland Airport,  in Hanson, Massachusetts is a public use airport owned by Cranland Inc.  It has one runway, averages 102 flights per week, and has approximately 28 aircraft based on its field.

Benjamin Atwood owned and operated Cranland until his death on July 13, 1967.  Atwood died in an airplane crash close to Little Sandy in Pembroke, MA.  Atwood also owned Cranberry Sprayers Inc. located at Cranland.  Atwood was one of the first jet pilots in the US Air Force.
Dennis K. Burke was the sole owner of the airport until July 26, 2011, he sold the airport to Peter T. Oakley, who is also the Airport Manager.
One historic aircraft, a Grumman Widgeon formerly owned by singer Jimmy Buffett (then registered as N1471N), is housed in the main hangar. It is now owned by Burke, who re-registered it as N3N. This Widgeon was rebuilt by former airport manager Michael Maurano. Cranland Airport is also the home of Experimental Aircraft Association (EAA) Chapter 279  http://www.eaa279.org/ . The club hosts a fly-In breakfast every third Sunday each month between April and October 8–11 am and it is open to the public. Dozens of regional based aircraft from nearby Plymouth, Marshfield, And Mansfield municipal airports fly into Cranland where breakfast is served on airport grounds. Aircraft usually include local Cessnas, piper cubs, and other General Aviation icons. some of the most notable regularly appearing aircraft include a rare radial engine powered variant of the Fairchild F.22, a vintage 1940 Cessna 140, a Vietnam War era Cessna L-19 Bird-Dog observation airplane, a World War II era De Havilland Chipmunk trainer, a Pits S-2 bi-plane, a Boeing PT-17 Stearman bi-plane fitted with a 450 hp engine, and a restored Beechcraft C-45 Expeditor (a former military variant of the Beech 18). The fly-in normally includes flyovers and demonstrations of the present aircraft later, in the June 2012 fly-in an Army National Guard UH-60 Blackhawk helicopter landed at the airport for display being the first time that the Cranland fly-in had any military involvement.

Incidents and Accidents

On August 1, 2007, a small plane crashed 40 yards from the runway. The only death was the pilot, a 63-year-old man.

References

External links
 http://www.eaa279.org/index.htm - EAA Chapter 279, based at Cranland

Hanson, Massachusetts
Airports in Plymouth County, Massachusetts